Sue Hole is an Australian former professional tennis player.

Active in the 1960s and 1970s, Hole competed in overseas tournaments during her career, including the French Open and Wimbledon. She featured in the singles third round of the 1966 Australian Championships.

References

External links
 

Year of birth missing (living people)
Living people
Australian female tennis players